Craven A (stylized as Craven "A") is a British brand of cigarette, currently manufactured by British American Tobacco under some of its subsidiaries. It was originally created by the Carreras Tobacco Company in 1921 and made by them until its merger into Rothmans International in 1972, who then produced the brand until Rothmans was acquired by British American Tobacco in 1999. 

The cigarette brand is named after the third Earl of Craven, after the "Craven Mixture", a tobacco blend formulated for the 3rd Earl in the 1860s by tobacconist Don José Joaquin Carreras.

History
After the end of World War I, the cigarette market resumed its normal competitive spirit with the Carreras Tobacco Company once more well to the fore. Bernhard Baron, a director of Carreras, knew that to compete successfully his product had to be better than his competitors' and in 1921 Carreras launched Craven "A", using the name of the 3rd Earl of Craven. Presumably its name did not refer to the normal meaning of the word 'craven' (cowardly); beyond the historic connection to the "Craven Mixture" tobacco blend, the year of release of the Craven "A" brand coincided with the well-publicised death of the 4th Earl of Craven in a yachting accident on 10 July 1921.  It was the first machine-made cork-tipped cigarette, and it became a household name in over 120 countries with the slogan "Will Not Affect Your Throat".  

Following the success of Craven A, several other companies launched cork-tipped cigarettes which enjoyed varying degrees of success. Few (if any) of these remain available as of 2019.

At the same time as Craven A was pioneering a new fashion in cigarette smoking, the competition was moving in on the coupon business. Carreras participated in this market with their Black Cat brand.

The brand was widely used in World War II not only by British soldiers, but in general. Craven A was one of several brands donated by tobacco manufacturers to soldiers' rations in the hope of developing ongoing brand loyalty.

Also during the Second World War, General Charles de Gaulle, in exile in London, had difficulties in obtaining his usual French brown cigarettes brand Gitanes. Consequently, he started smoking Craven A and apparently took a liking to the blonde tobacco, which until then had been rare in occupied France.

Muhammad Ali Jinnah, the founder of Pakistan, chain-smoked fifty Craven A cigarettes a day, even while terminally ill with tuberculosis.

Advertising

Craven 'A' started using the slogan "For Your Throat's Sake" around 1939. It had a famous slogan, "Will Not Affect Your Throat".

Many advertising posters were made to promote Craven 'A' cigarettes.

Counterfeiting
In May 2014, Carreras Limited warned that counterfeit Craven A cigarettes were being sold in Jamaica. The counterfeits were said to be non-compliant with Jamaican Public Health labelling regulations.

Markets
Craven 'A' were or still are sold in the following countries: Canada, United States, Jamaica, United Kingdom, Germany, France, Austria, Italy, Cyprus, Ivory Coast, South Africa, Palestine, Vietnam, Malaysia, China, Taiwan, Hong Kong and Australia.

Sponsorship
The company sponsored the 1981 Craven Mild Cup Rugby League tournament in New South Wales, Australia. Craven 'A' sponsored events in Canada such as the "Just for Laughs" Canadian Comedy Tour in March 1999. The company was also a long-time sponsor of Australian racing driver Allan Grice.

In popular culture

Novels
Craven 'A' cigarettes appeared in the James Bond novel Dr. No. Shanghai beggars in J.G Ballard's novel Empire of the Sun are described as 'shaking their Craven A tins like reformed smokers.'

Craven 'A' cigarettes are mentioned in Patricia Highsmith's novel The Price of Salt, where they are smoked by Carol, one of the main characters. They are not shown in the 2015 film of the novel.

Craven ‘A’ cigarettes were also the cigarettes of choice for the father of Pakistan, Muhammad Ali Jinnah, as mentioned in the book by his younger sister, Fatima Jinnah.

Music
The name of this brand is taken anecdotally in the song Les Bêtises by Sabine Paturel and in "Le Chien" by Léo Ferré. 
The name "Craven A" is also included in the song "Tendresse et amitié" by Robert Charlebois and the text is written by Réjean Ducharme.
The brand is also mentioned in the 1982 song Lost Mi Love by Yellowman.

Films
According to his biographer, the French actor Jean Gabin was a regular smoker of filterless Craven A, which he alternated with Gitanes. In the film Pasha, a package of Craven A is visible on the desk of "Commissioner Louis Joss", Gabin, as well as in Le cave se rebiffe.

In the 1978 film Death on the Nile, Simon Doyle is asked by Monsieur Poirot if his fiancée, the wealthy heiress Linnet Ridgeway, smokes, to which he responds "Just Craven 'A'".

See also
 Tobacco smoking

References

1921 establishments in the United Kingdom
Philip Morris brands
British American Tobacco brands